Leo's Tavern is a restaurant and pub in the Donegal Gaeltacht, known as the home of music artists Clannad, Enya and Moya Brennan. The pub opened in 1968 and held Irish traditional music sessions nightly, becoming the musical starting block for the children of Leo Brennan, the pub's founder.

History

Origins and development
At the end of Ireland's showband era, musician Leo Ó Braonáin settled with his wife Máire "Baba", opening Tábhairne Leo in 1968. The pub became a gathering place for musicians and singers to take part in Irish traditional music sessions. While working shifts behind the bar, Leo's children Máire (Moya), Ciarán, Pól Ó Braonáin, Noel, and Pádraig Ó Dúgáin would accompany their father on stage to tell old Irish stories, or seanchas, to the locals. While touring in later years as Celtic/Folk band Clannad, the siblings, their uncles, and their younger siblings Brídín, Eithne (Enya), Olive, and Deirdre would perform.

The pub has also hosted guests and performers such as Bono, The Edge, Paul Brady, Christy Moore, Mairéad Ní Mhaonaigh and Mary Black. Tour buses of tourists began to visit the pub to hear Leo sing and tell stories.

The pub was renovated in 2002, and now also has a restaurant and features Gold, Platinum and Diamond discs and memorabilia associated with Clannad, Moya and Enya.

Concerts
 The tavern was celebrated during the 2005 Errigal Arts Festival, at which Leo and Baba Brennan were awarded the Freedom of Donegal by Donegal County Council. The ceremony, held on 14 July 2005, was preceded by a series of concerts called Oidhreacht (Irish for Legacy). These concerts featured Leo and Baba's daughters performing at St. Mary's Church in Derrybeg. A jazz concert was also held, with some of these events being broadcast on TG4 and RTÉ Television.

Leo's Tavern marked its 40th anniversary in 2008 and held a three-day celebration. A concert was held, featuring music from Leo Brennan, Clannad, Brídín Brennan, Deirdre Brennan, Mairéad Ní Mhaonaigh and Manus Lunny.

Leo Brennan died on 22 June 2016, aged 90.

References

External links
Official site

Buildings and structures in Gweedore
Culture in Gweedore
Music venues in the Republic of Ireland
Pubs in the Republic of Ireland
Restaurants in the Republic of Ireland
Tourist attractions in County Donegal
Restaurants established in 1968
1968 establishments in Ireland